A List of Czech films of the 1940s.

1940s
Czech
Films